The Selby-Bigge Baronetcy, of King's Sutton in the County of Northampton, was a title in the Baronetage of the United Kingdom. It was created on 14 February 1919 for the civil servant and author Sir Amherst Selby-Bigge. He was Permanent Secretary to the Board of Education from 1911 to 1925. The title became extinct on the death of the second Baronet in 1973.

Selby-Bigge baronets, of King's Sutton (1919)
Sir (Lewis) Amherst Selby-Bigge, 1st Baronet (1860–1951)
Sir John Amherst Selby-Bigge, 2nd Baronet (1892–1973)

See also
 Selby baronets
 Selby family

References

External links

 
 

Extinct baronetcies in the Baronetage of the United Kingdom
Selby family